Raul Guilherme Plassmann (born September 27, 1944 in Antonina, PR) is a Brazilian former football player and manager who played as a goalkeeper.

He made nearly 200 Campeonato Brasileiro appearances for Cruzeiro and Flamengo. At international level, he was a member of the Brazil squad that took part at the 1975 Copa América.

Honours
Flamengo
Rio State Championship 1978, 1979, 1979 (Especial), 1981
Brazilian National Championship 1980, 1982, 1983
Intercontinental Cup 1981
Copa Libertadores de América: 1981

Cruzeiro
Minas Gerais State Championship 1965, 1966, 1967, 1968, 1969, 1972, 1973, 1974, 1975, 1977
Taça Brasil 1966
Copa Libertadores de América: 1976

References

External links

1944 births
Living people
Brazilian footballers
Brazilian football managers
Association football goalkeepers
Brazilian people of German descent
Club Athletico Paranaense players
São Paulo FC players
Cruzeiro Esporte Clube players
CR Flamengo footballers
Cruzeiro Esporte Clube managers
Esporte Clube Juventude managers
Londrina Esporte Clube managers
Brazil international footballers
1975 Copa América players